RAF Station De Winton was a World War II air training station located south of Calgary, and east of De Winton, Alberta, Canada. The Royal Air Force (RAF) established No. 31 Elementary Flying Training School (31 EFTS) at the station. Like other RAF stations in Canada, it was subject to RCAF administrative and operational control.

The aerodrome was completed in 1940 and No. 31 EFTS began operating in June 1941. In 1942, the school formally became part of the British Commonwealth Air Training Plan. It was a civilian operation with instructors from the Toronto Flying Club who originally instructed at No. 1 Elementary Flying Training School at Malton, Ontario. Aircraft flown at De Winton include Stearmans, Tiger Moths, and Cornells,

De Winton was closed in September 1944 and is now the privately operated De Winton/South Calgary Airport.
Although the runways and some concrete structures from the airbase remain, the airfield is no longer active for fixed wing use. Some helicopter training, such as auto-rotation and hover practice, is still performed at the airfield, but all flights originate from other airports. Two of the runways are in disrepair and overgrown with grass, while the third runway and tarmac only partially maintained for use as an automotive driver training area.

Aerodrome Information  
The airfield was constructed in a typical BCATP wartime pattern, with three runways formed in a triangle.  
Three runways were listed as follows:

References

 Wings Over Alberta - De Winton Retrieved December 13, 2009
 Bruce Forsyth's Military History Page - No. 31 Elementary Flying Training School Retrieved December 13, 2009
 Hatch, F. J. Aerodrome of Democracy: Canada and the British Commonwealth Air Training Plan. Department of National Defence Directorate of History. 1983.

Royal Air Force stations
Airports of the British Commonwealth Air Training Plan
Foreign military bases in Canada
Military installations of the United Kingdom in other countries